The 1888 Isle of Thanet by-election was held on 29 June 1888 after the death of the incumbent Conservative MP Edward Robert King-Harman.  The seat was retained by the Conservative candidate James Lowther, a former MP and government minister.

References 

By-elections to the Parliament of the United Kingdom in Kent constituencies
1888 elections in the United Kingdom
June 1888 events